James Benton Jennings (born November 14, 1933 in Crystal City, Missouri) is a former player in the National Football League.

Career
Jennings was drafted by the Green Bay Packers in the twenty-sixth round of the 1955 NFL Draft and played that season with the team. He played at the collegiate level for the University of Missouri Tigers.

See also
List of Green Bay Packers players

References

1933 births
Living people
People from Crystal City, Missouri
Sportspeople from Greater St. Louis
Players of American football from Missouri
Missouri Tigers football players
Green Bay Packers players